Czech Republic women's national inline hockey team is the national women's inline hockey team for Czech Republic. The team finished fifth at the 2011 Women's World Inline Hockey Championships.

References 

National inline hockey teams
Inline hockey
Inline hockey in the Czech Republic